Dennis Grote (born 9 August 1986) is a German professional footballer who plays as a midfielder for Preußen Münster. In 2009, he won the 2009 UEFA Under-21 Championship with the Germany under-21 national team.

Club career
After starting his career at Bundesliga side 1. FC Kaiserslautern, he joined VfL Bochum in 2002 and came from the youth team to the first team in the Bundesliga. In the second half of the 2004–05 season, Grote played as an amateur in five league games. In summer 2005, he signed a professional contract.

On 16 December 2005, he scored his first professional goal in the 88th minute for a 1–0 victory in a second division match against Unterhaching. Easter Monday 2006, he earned promotion with VfL Bochum to the Bundesliga after winning the 2. Bundesliga.

He scored his first Bundesliga goal on 5 May 2007 in a 3–0 away victory against Hamburger SV. In 2007, he signed a new deal with Bochum until the end of the 2011 season. He also scored his first goal of the season against Hamburger SV in a 1–0 victory for Bochum in November 2009. In his final season at Bochum in 2010–11, he only played eight times for them in the Bundesliga. During winter break 2010–11, he moved to Rot-Weiß Oberhausen on loan. However, Grote was unable to save them from relegation after playing 13 times. Oberhausen finished the season in 17th place and were relegated from the 2. Bundesliga.

In August 2011, Grote joined Leeds United on trial. In August 2011, he played for Leeds against Farsley Celtic. He helped getting two assists in the match for fellow German trialist Felix Luz.

He joined MSV Duisburg for the 2014–15 season.

He moved to Chemnitzer FC for the 2016–17 season. After three season at the club, he moved to Rot-Weiss Essen ahead of the 2019–20 season. The deal was announced already on 8 April 2019 and he penned a two-year contract.

On 7 February 2022, Grote was released from his contract with Rot-Weiss Essen and signed a contract until the end of the 2021–22 season with Wacker Innsbruck in Austria.

On 13 July 2022, Grote, who was free again after the bankruptcy of Wacker Innsbruck, signed a contract  with Preußen Münster.

International career
Grote played for Germany at various age levels, he won the 2009 UEFA Under-21 Championship with Germany in 2009, in the same side as the likes of Mesut Özil, Manuel Neuer and Sami Khedira. He was an unused substitute against England Under 21s in the final.

Career statistics

Honours
Germany U21
UEFA Under-21 Championship: 2009

References

External links

1986 births
Living people
People from Kaiserslautern
German footballers
Footballers from Rhineland-Palatinate
Association football midfielders
Germany under-21 international footballers
Germany youth international footballers
Bundesliga players
2. Bundesliga players
3. Liga players
VfL Bochum players
VfL Bochum II players
Rot-Weiß Oberhausen players
SC Preußen Münster players
MSV Duisburg players
Chemnitzer FC players
Rot-Weiss Essen players
FC Wacker Innsbruck (2002) players
Regionalliga players
German expatriate footballers
German expatriate sportspeople in Austria
Expatriate footballers in Austria